Gajra Kottary is an Indian screenplay writer and television writer.

Early life
Gajra Kottary was born in Delhi and was educated at the Convent of Jesus and Mary and Lady Shri Ram College for Women. In 1988, she excelled in the post-graduate course in Journalism at the Indian Institute of Mass Communication for being the top student and was awarded The Hindu Gold Medal.  She worked briefly as a journalist, initially at The Statesman in Delhi and later at the Magna group.  She contributed to several of the country's newspapers and magazines. Garja Kottary also wrote on developmental and women's issues for CHOICES, the magazine of the United Nations Development Program.

Career
Gajra debuted as an author in early 1996 with her first collection of women-centric short stories, titled Fragile Victories. This was followed by another compendium, The Last Laugh. Her debut novel Broken Melodies was published by HarperCollins Publishers India in 2011, simultaneously with its Hindi translation Bikhre Sur. Gajra subsequently co-authored her first original Hindi novel, Kora Kaagaz. Her last novel Once Upon a Star was released in December 2014.

 Following this was her first long running daily of 668 episodes, the award-winning Astitva – Ek Prem Kahani. Her next major writing assignment was to develop the story of the nation's popular and acclaimed daily television serial Balika Vadhu, on Colors TV, for which she completed writing 2175 episodes on 12 April 2016. It has been entered as the longest running Hindi soap on Indian Television in the Limca Book of records 2016. It is a serial that has highlighted and taken a stand against many social evils extant in Indian society, starting with child marriage.

Gajra has also written the story for the 55 episode mega historical television serial Buddha. She has written many other acclaimed shows including Jyoti, Godh Bharai, Panaah, Ghar Ek Sapna and Ek Veer ki Ardaas – Veera, Satrangi Sasuraal.  She has recently turned creative producer for two shows being telecast on Zee's Zindagi channel, namely TV Ke Uss Paar and Khwaabon Ki Zamin Par. The latter being her own story.

Awards

Gajra Kottary has won major writing awards for television, including the Indian Television Academy Award, RAPA award, Indian Telly Award, Apsara Award and the Global Indian Television's Best Writer Award. Two more novels written by Gajra are said to be published next year by HarperCollins India Publishers.

Selected works

Fiction
The Last Laugh (2003)
Broken melodies (2011)
Once Upon a Star (2014)
Girls Don't Cry (2017)

Television

Writer

External links 
 https://www.imdb.com/name/nm4607871/
 http://www.bollywoodlife.com/news-gossip/balika-vadhus-writer-gajra-kottary-there-is-no-long-term-planning-in-serials-these-days
 
 http://www.tellychakkar.com/tv/tv-news/balika-vadhu-writer-gajra-kottary-pens-her-first-novel
 http://www.indiantelevision.org.in/interviews/writersdesk/gajra.htm
 Website : www.gajrakottary.in

References 

Indian television writers
Living people
Indian women television writers
21st-century Indian women writers
21st-century Indian dramatists and playwrights
Women writers from Delhi
Hindi screenwriters
Screenwriters from Delhi
Year of birth missing (living people)
21st-century Indian screenwriters